Great Yarmouth railway station (originally Yarmouth Vauxhall) is one of two eastern termini of the Wherry Lines in the East of England, serving the seaside town of Great Yarmouth, Norfolk.

Trains from Great Yarmouth run to Norwich via one of two routes: either via , the more regularly used line, or via . Great Yarmouth is  down the line from Norwich via Acle and it is  via Reedham.

The station is managed currently by Greater Anglia, which also operates all of the trains that call. There is one train per hour to Norwich off-peak, with the service increasing in frequency during peak times.

History

Yarmouth Vauxhall
The Bill for the Yarmouth and Norwich Railway (Y&NR) received Royal Assent on 18 June 1842. Work started on the line in April 1843 and the line and its stations were opened on 1 May 1844. Great Yarmouth station was originally named Yarmouth Vauxhall.  The Y&NR line to Norwich through Reedham was the first railway in the county to open.

On 30 June 1845, a Bill authorising the amalgamation of the Yarmouth & Norwich Railway with the Norwich & Brandon Railway came into effect, and Yarmouth Vauxhall station became a Norfolk Railway asset.

The Eastern Counties Railway (ECR) and its rival the Eastern Union Railway (EUR) were both sizing up the NR to acquire and expand their railway empire. The ECR trumped the EUR by taking over the NR, including Yarmouth-Vauxhall Station on 8 May 1848.

By the 1860s the railways in East Anglia were in financial trouble, and most were leased to the Eastern Counties Railway, which wished to amalgamate formally but could not obtain government agreement for this until an Act of Parliament on 7 August 1862, when the Great Eastern Railway (GER) was formed by the amalgamation. Actually, Yarmouth Vauxhall became a GER station on 1 July 1862, when the GER took over the ECR and the EUR, before the Bill received Royal Assent.

Two decades into GER ownership the latter decided to build a shorter route between Yarmouth Vauxhall to Norwich Thorpe. Work started in the early-1880s. The GER started the new line about one mile west of Yarmouth Vauxhall and the junction was named Breydon.

The system settled down for the next four decades, apart from the disruption of World War I. The difficult economic circumstances that existed after the war led the government to pass the Railways Act 1921, which led to the creation of the Big Four. The GER amalgamated with several other companies to form the London and North Eastern Railway (LNER). Yarmouth Vauxhall became an LNER station on 1 January 1923.

In May 1943, the station was badly damaged during an air raid. The upper floor of the station building had to be demolished, but train services continued to operate during this period. The remainder of the original station building was demolished and rebuilt in 1960.

On nationalisation in 1948, the station and its services became part of the Eastern Region of British Railways. The station was renamed Yarmouth by British Railways at some point between 1953 and 1962.

Before rail closures of the 1950s and the later Beeching Axe, the station was the largest of the three major railway stations in the town. The three stations had been linked together since 1882 by the Yarmouth Union Railway. The station is now the sole surviving station in the town.

The station was renamed Great Yarmouth on 16 May 1989. There used to be large sidings and an engine shed before they were demolished to make way for an Asda superstore and bypass.

On privatisation the station and its services were transferred to Anglia Railways, which operated it until April 2004 when National Express East Anglia won the replacement franchise, operating under the brand name "one" until February 2008. From February 2012 Abellio Greater Anglia took over operating the franchise.

The town was also formerly served by the following stations:

Yarmouth Beach

The station closed in 1959 and the site is now a coach station, although plans exist to turn the area into offices.

Yarmouth South Town

It closed in 1970.

Newtown Halt

 was located on Salisbury Road and was owned by the M&GN. It opened in 1933 and closed in 1959.

Services

Summer 1959
With the closure of Yarmouth Beach station in early 1959, Vauxhall became the focus of the summer Saturday traffic for Great Yarmouth. The station had always had a number of summer Saturday trains up to this point but this hike in numbers had led to some re-modelling of the station layout - platform lengthening and changes to carriage stabling - in order to cope with the additional traffic.

A typical summer Saturday saw an additional 24 timetabled passenger trains from locations including York, Derby, Sheffield, Manchester, Leicester, and Sunderland. In addition, on 25 July 1959 there were an extra eight holiday relief workings that ran. Some local workings were cancelled to cope with this influx of trains, but it indicates the significant numbers of UK holiday makers still travelling by train and still holidaying in Great Yarmouth at this time.

Present day
There is one train each hour between Great Yarmouth and Norwich, with additional services during the morning and evening peaks. Most trains run via Acle, although there are still a number that run via Reedham. Sunday services tend to be hourly and, up to 16:00, every alternating service runs via Reedham.

All services are operated by Greater Anglia.

There are proposals to run a wider variety of direct services from Yarmouth to London Liverpool Street, Stansted Airport, and Peterborough from 2025.

Carriage sidings

New sidings were provided at the western end of the station to cope with the additional services operating into the station following the closure of the M&GN system. It had fallen out of use in the 1980s when the Norwich Crown Point depot was built.

In 2010 the unused sidings were purchased by Great Yarmouth Borough Council, intended for use as a freight terminal despite the lack of rail connection to the town's port. It was hoped that 10,000 tonnes of sugar cane per week would be carried from Yarmouth to Cantley. The need to use a lorry shuttle between the docks and the rail yard, along with a £3.2 million quote for replacing the sidings at Cantley, saw the plan dropped.

In May 2020, Eastern Rail Services commenced a lease with Norfolk County Council and Network Rail for Yarmouth Vauxhall sidings. Managing director James Steward said the siding matched ERS' requirement for an East Anglian site to base its rolling stock. Following extensive de-vegetation works, Direct Rail Services 37402 became the first locomotive in 19 years to run into the sidings on 26 May 2020, followed the next day by it delivering five former Abellio Greater Anglia Mark 3 coaches for storage. On 6 July 2020 ERS was authorised a license exemption permitting them to operate trains within the site.

Class 08 08762, owned by Eastern Rail Services' sister company RMS Locotec, was delivered by road from Heaton TMD on 16 June 2020 to take up shunting duties on site.

Recent developments 

A campaign was launched in 2010 to bring Great Yarmouth Station up-to-date, called the "Fix Great Yarmouth Station" campaign. The project attracted more than 3,000 pledges of support.

During 2012 Great Yarmouth Community Trust, in partnership with Greater Anglia, provided a welcoming and information service at the station for incoming holidaymakers and tourists.  This service was operated as 'Welcome Host' and continued in 2013. The service was run on a voluntary basis.

In 2017, signalling and track layout changes saw the lifting of the tracks leading into Platform 1, reducing the number of operational platforms at the station to three.

In 2018 it was announced that the station would benefit from £710,000 of investment, redeveloping the entrance and surrounding areas, with the work being funded by the New Anglia Local Enterprise Partnership's Growth Deal. The project was completed in November 2018.

Gallery

References

External links

 Berney Arms Online Extensive information on old railways in Great Yarmouth
Campaign for improvements to the station

Railway stations in Norfolk
DfT Category C2 stations
Former Great Eastern Railway stations
Railway stations in Great Britain opened in 1844
Greater Anglia franchise railway stations
Great Yarmouth